Perkyn is a surname originating from Cornwall, England. Notable people with the surname include:

Richard Perkyn (fl. 1335), MP for Wycombe (UK Parliament constituency)
Perkyn, character in The Cook's Tale

See also
Perkin (disambiguation)

Surnames of British Isles origin